Demy may refer to:

 Demy, a paper size measuring 17.5 × 22.5 in (445 × 572 mm)
 Demy (singer) (born 1991), Greek singer
 Demy (album), 2017
 Demy (surname)
 Demy (coin)
 Demy de Vries (born 1999), Dutch fashion model
 Demy de Zeeuw (born 1983), Dutch footballer
 Demy, a recipient of a demyship, a scholarship at Magdalen College, Oxford

See also
Demi (disambiguation)

Dutch given names
Unisex given names